Capo Caccia Lighthouse (Algherese Catalan: Far del Cap de Caça) is an active 19th century lighthouse situated at the extremity of Capo Caccia,  from Tramariglio a frazione of Alghero on the western coast of Sardinia.

Description
The lighthouse was built in 1864 on the top of the namesake promontory overlooking the sea, just above Neptune's Grotto connected by s staircase of 656 steps named Escala de Cabirol (Staircase of roe).

The lantern was supplied by various fuels, including acetylene up to 1880, and then by petroleum gas, until in 1961 the plant was electrified. The rotating optic which was built in Paris by Barbier, Benard, et Turenne in 1951, is equipped with a Fresnel lens, with four deflectors at 90° to each other with a focal distance of 375 millimetres. The lighthouse is active, fully automated, even if manned by the two keepers who also have the task of maintaining the other lighthouses along the western Sardinia coast. It is operated by Marina Militare identified by the code number 1418 E.F.

See also
 List of lighthouses in Italy

References

External links

 Servizio Fari Marina Militare 

Lighthouses in Italy
Alghero
Buildings and structures in Sardinia